The Nissan FF-L is an automobile platform for front wheel drive automobiles.  It has been a huge success for the company, along with the rear wheel drive Nissan FM platform.  FF-L cars are built at Nissan's Smyrna, Tennessee factory, and the Murano is built in Japan and in Canton, Mississippi since November 2014.

The FF-L platform pushes the wheels out to the corners, allowing a long wheelbase and wide stance within a manageable overall length. Along with the platform's inherent handling and performance advantages, it allows greater packaging and styling flexibility.

Models
 2001-2006 Nissan Altima
 2002-2007 Nissan Murano
 2003-2008 Nissan Maxima
 2003-2009 Nissan Quest
 2003-2008 Nissan Teana
 2003-2009 Nissan Presage
 2004-2011 Renault Samsung SM7
 2005-2010 Renault Samsung SM5

References

FF-L